Milojko Vasilić (born July 8, 1989) is a Serbian professional basketball player for Terme Olimia Podčetrtek of the  Slovenian League.

References

External links
Profile at realgm.com
Profile at eurobasket.com

1989 births
Living people
Basketball League of Serbia players
BC Prievidza players
KK Borac Čačak players
KK FMP players
KK Smederevo players
Serbian expatriate basketball people in North Macedonia
Serbian expatriate basketball people in Slovakia
Serbian expatriate basketball people in Slovenia
Serbian men's basketball players
Sportspeople from Užice
Centers (basketball)